The 1952 North Carolina gubernatorial election was held on November 4, 1952. Democratic nominee William B. Umstead defeated Republican nominee Herbert F. "Chub" Seawell Jr. with 67.50% of the vote. 

Seawell, an attorney, followed in the footsteps of his father, Herbert Sr., who had lost the 1928 North Carolina gubernatorial election.

Primary elections
Primary elections were held on May 31, 1952.

Democratic primary

Candidates
William B. Umstead, former United States Senator
Hubert E. Olive, former judge of the North Carolina Superior Court
Manley R. Dunaway

Results

General election

Candidates
William B. Umstead, Democratic
Herbert F. "Chub" Seawell Jr., Republican

Results

References

1952
North Carolina
Gubernatorial